Forrest Edward "Frosty" Westering (December 5, 1927 – April 12, 2013) was an American football coach.  He served as the head coach at Parsons College in Fairfield, Iowa from 1962 to 1963, Lea College in Albert Lea, Minnesota from  1966 to 1971, and Pacific Lutheran University in Parkland, Washington 1972 from 2003, compiling a career college football coaching record of 305–96–7 and never had a losing season.  Westering led his Pacific Lutheran Lutes teams to eight national championships, winning four: three NAIA Division II Football National Championship, in 1980, 1987, and 1993, and an NCAA Division III Football Championship in 1999.  He retired as the ninth winningest coach in college football history.  Westering was a recipient of the Amos Alonzo Stagg Award in 2013, was named the NCAA Division III Coach of the Year in 1999 and was named NAIA National College Football Coach of the Year in 1983 and 1993.  He was inducted into the NAIA Hall of Fame in 1995 and the College Football Hall of Fame in 2005.  Westering coached 26 NAIA and NCAA First Team All-Americans including his grandson Chad Johnson who was the recipient of the Gagliardi Trophy which is given to the most outstanding player in Division III college football.  In 2019, ESPN ranked Frosty 39th on the list of "150 Greatest Coaches in College Football History."

After Westering retired, his son, Scott, took over as head football coach of the Pacific Lutheran Lutes after many successful seasons of being the offensive coordinator. He went 74–54 in 14 seasons including two NCAA Division III National Playoff Berths in 2012 and 2013. As head coach of the Lutes, Scott coached over fifty First Team All-Conference selections and was inducted into the Pacific Lutheran Athletics Hall of Fame. Scott was also an All-American tight end on Pacific Lutheran's 1980 National Championship team. His daughter, Sue Westering, is a gym teacher at Gig Harbor High School, and coached the girls volleyball team until 2014. She also assisted her brother at Pacific Lutheran. 

Westering served in the United States Marine Corps immediately following World War II.  Well known for his motivational speaking and his efforts to spread his positive outlook on life, Westering wrote popular books, Make the Big Time Where You Are and The Strange Secret of The Big Time. Westering is also highly popular for re-writing the poem "The Man in the Arena" originally written by Theodore Roosevelt Jr. in 1910. A true family man, Westering was married to Donna Belle Westering for over sixty years. Together they raised five children and had thirteen grandchildren. He was buried at Tahoma National Cemetery in Kent, Washington after he died on April 12, 2013, with his family at his side. He was 85.

Playing career and military service
Westering played college football in 1945 at Drake University in Des Moines, Iowa and was a member of the Drake Bulldogs football team that won the 1946 Raisin Bowl.  He enlisted the United States Marine Corps in January 1946.  After his military service, he returned to college at the University of Omaha—now known as University of Nebraska Omaha—where he played football and ran track.

Head coaching record

College football

See also
 List of college football coaches with 200 wins

References

External links
 
 

1927 births
2013 deaths
Drake Bulldogs football players
Nebraska–Omaha Mavericks football players
Pacific Lutheran Lutes football coaches
Parsons Wildcats athletic directors
Parsons Wildcats football coaches
College men's track and field athletes in the United States
High school football coaches in Iowa
College Football Hall of Fame inductees
United States Marines
Sportspeople from Council Bluffs, Iowa
Coaches of American football from Iowa
Players of American football from Iowa
Track and field athletes from Iowa
Burials at Tahoma National Cemetery